The 1986 Nevada gubernatorial election took place on November 4, 1986. Incumbent Democrat Richard Bryan won re-election to a second term as Governor of Nevada, defeating Republican nominee Patty Cafferata.

Democratic primary

Candidates
Richard Bryan, incumbent Governor of Nevada
Herb Tobman

Results

Republican primary

Candidates
Patty Cafferata, state treasurer
Jim Stone
Joni Wines
M.L. "Smokey" Stover
Robert A. Swartz

Results

General election

Candidates
Richard Bryan (D), incumbent Governor of Nevada
Patty Cafferata (R), state treasurer
Lou Tomburello (L)

Results

References

1986
Nevada
Gubernatorial